Thomas Lee Hoover Jr. (born January 23, 1941) is an American former professional basketball player.

Hoover was born in Washington, D.C. A  forward/center from Villanova University, Hoover played in the National Basketball Association (NBA) from 1963 to 1967 as a member of the New York Knicks and St. Louis Hawks. He jumped to the American Basketball Association (ABA) in 1967, and played two seasons there with the Denver Rockets, Houston Mavericks, Minnesota Pipers, and New York Nets. Known for his bruising, brawling play, Hoover often was cast in an enforcer role as one of the bad boys of pro basketball. In his NBA/ABA career, he averaged 5.9 points and 6.2 rebounds per game.

Since his basketball career ended, Hoover has worked in a wide variety of fields. With former NFL player Lane Howell, he ran an employment program for teenagers in New York City. Afterward, he turned to the entertainment industry, and worked as a road manager for Richard Pryor, The Spinners and Natalie Cole. He had a brief career acting in television commercials, then channeled his interest in boxing into a job with the New York State Athletic Commission. He later ran the Adopt-A-School Program in New York City.

References

1941 births
American men's basketball players
Archbishop Carroll High School (Washington, D.C.) alumni
Basketball players from Washington, D.C.
Camden Bullets players
Centers (basketball)
Denver Rockets players
Houston Mavericks players
Living people
Minnesota Pipers players
New York Knicks players
New York Nets players
New York State Athletic Commissioners
Parade High School All-Americans (boys' basketball)
St. Louis Hawks players
Syracuse Nationals draft picks
Villanova Wildcats men's basketball players
Wilmington Blue Bombers players